Kenny Johnson is an American basketball coach who is currently an assistant coach for Rhode Island. He was formerly an assistant coach with the La Salle and the Louisville Cardinals under former head coach Rick Pitino.

College coaching career
On April 21, 2014, after serving for two seasons as an assistant coach and recruiting coordinator for Tom Crean at Indiana University, Johnson was hired as an assistant coach for Louisville under head coach Rick Pitino, one year after Louisville won the NCAA Division 1 men's basketball tournament. Johnson was placed on administrative leave at Louisville shortly after the 2017–18 NCAA Division I men's basketball corruption scandal and FBI investigation into the college basketball program in September 2017 that also resulted in the firing of Pitino, athletic director Tom Jurich and assistant coach Jordan Fair. Johnson was officially fired in November.

La Salle University hired Johnson in May 2018 to serve under new men's basketball coach Ashley Howard. On May 11, 2020, after being named in a Notice of Allegations regarding providing benefits to a recruit at Louisville, Johnson was fired from La Salle.

Johnson also held the position of vice president/assistant director of basketball operations for well-known AAU program TeamTakeover for six years. During that time, he also served as head coach of the program's 16U team.

Personal
Johnson attended Oxon Hill High School in his hometown of Oxon Hill, Maryland. He had his playing career cut short by injury in his second season of varsity basketball. Johnson went on to attend University of Maryland-College Park, where in 1999 he earned his degree in cell, molecular biology and genetics.

Prior to becoming a college assistant, Johnson was very active in the Maryland high school coaching circuit. He held assistant positions at Eleanor Roosevelt High School (2002-2006), Dr. Henry Wise High School (2006-2007) and Paul VI High School (2007-2011).

References

External links
 Towson Tigers bio
 Indiana Hoosiers bio

Living people
American men's basketball coaches
Basketball coaches from Maryland
High school basketball coaches in the United States
Indiana Hoosiers men's basketball coaches
People from Oxon Hill, Maryland
Towson Tigers men's basketball coaches
La Salle Explorers men's basketball coaches
University of Maryland, College Park alumni
Year of birth missing (living people)